Papplewick School is a non-selective independent day and boarding preparatory school for boys aged 6–13 (Years 2–8) in Ascot, England. It occupies a 15-acre semi-rural campus across from Ascot Racecourse.

History
It was founded in 1947 as a small boys' school and grew under long-serving headmaster Peter Knatchbull-Hugessen. The school became a charitable trust in 1964 under a board of governors. Extensive additions to the accommodation were carried out in 1998 under a building programme which included a sports hall, music school and two technology suites.

Academics
All boys generally take English, Maths, Science, French, Classics, History, Geography, Divinity, Design & Technology (DT), Art, ICT, PE and Reasoning Common Entrance Exam prep begins in Year 7.

Many leavers often go on to other nearby independent schools such as Eton College,     Harrow School, and Winchester College.

Extracurricular activities
Sport is an important aspect of school life and a wide range of sports are available. The main sports are football (Michaelmas Term), rugby (Lent Term) and cricket (Summer Term). Besides the main sports, boys may represent the school in squash, swimming, cross-country, hockey, polo, shooting, table tennis, and chess. The cricket and football teams regularly tour abroad during the holidays. Papplewick is also home to the youngest antiquarian booksellers in the world and now members of the PBFA, the Bibliomaniacs.

Thursday afternoons are generally devoted to extracurricular activities. Activities available range from interest clubs, music, riding, drama and chess.

Boarding
About half of the boys in the school are boarders. Weekly boarders go home at the week-end, full boarders usually only in school holidays and at half-terms. Boys aged 11 (Year 6) and above must be either full or weekly boarders, while many younger boys board on a flexible basis. They are grouped by years and looked after by three sets of "houseparents" per year group. The boarding programme was rated "outstanding" by Ofsted in its 2011 social care inspection.

Heads
1950–1979: Peter Merrick Knatchbull-Hugessen ( 5 June 1915 – 7 February 2008)
Stuart Morris 1981-1989
2008 – present: Tom Bunbury

Notable former pupils
 Ed Coode, British rower and Olympic gold medallist
 James Haskell, England rugby union international
Bo Guagua, socialite and son of Bo Xilai
Richard Curtis, screenwriter whose works include Bernard & The Genie, The Tall Guy and Bridget Jones: The Edge of Reason, and founder of the prestigious Barnard Scholarship for Gifted Youngsters.
Max Lahiff, Rugby Union

References

External links
Profile on the ISC website
Profile on the Good Schools Guide
ISI Inspection Reports
Ofsted Social Care Inspection Reports

Preparatory schools in Berkshire
Boarding schools in Berkshire
Boys' schools in Berkshire
Private schools in the Royal Borough of Windsor and Maidenhead
Educational institutions established in 1947
1947 establishments in England